JD is a Hindi feature film written, directed by Shailendra Pandey and produced by Anju Pandey & Shailendra Pandey . This Bollywood film is based on the life of an Indian journalist. The news portal "First Post" compared the story to Tarun Tejpal, editor-in-chief, involved in a Tehelka Magazine sexual assault case. The film was released on 22 September 2017.
Film JD is available on Prime Video 
, Jio Cinema  and Airtel Xstream

Real life people
Several actors in the film play roles that mimic their real-life jobs, including:

Retired Justice PD Kode (playing a judge) 
Politician  Amar Singh (playing a politician)
Rameshwar Gite (playing an advocate) 
Santosh Singh  (playing businessman)
Tanu Sharma (playing a TV anchor)
Sharat Pradhan, Ratanmani Lal, Sunanda Dikshit, and Subhash Sirke (playing editors)
Ruhani (playing an air hostess)

The film includes a song in which real Nautanki dancers, musicians, and singers from Kanpur perform.

Cast
 Govind Namdev as Divakar Verma
 Aman Verma as Lawyer 
 Vedita Pratap Singh as Noor
 Lalit Bisht as Jai Dwivedi aka JD
 Rina Charaniya 
 Arvind Gaur
 Surya Mohan Kulsherstha
 Shwetank Pandey 
 Jasveer Kaur as special appearance in the item number "Kamariya Pe Lattu"

Soundtrack
There are six songs in the film. The lyrics were written by Kumar Vijay and Sahil Fatehpuri. Sandip Soparrkar choreographed two songs.The music was composed by Ganesh Pandey and Jaan Nissar Lone, and was released by Zee Music Company.

Accolades

References

External links
 

2010s Hindi-language films
Films about journalists
2017 films
Indian films based on actual events